Santiago Pesquera Blanco (born April 21, 1973, in La Rioja) is a boccia player from Spain.  He has had cerebral palsy since birth and is a BC3 type athlete. His job is working with computers. He started playing sport when he was 17 years old. He also plays wheelchair track and field.

He competed at the 1996 Summer Paralympics in boccia.  He competed at the 2000 Summer Paralympics. He finished second in the BC3 two person event. He competed at the 2004 Summer Paralympics. He finished second in the BC3 two person event. He finished second in the BC3 one person event.  He competed at the 2008 Summer Paralympics.  He finished first in the BC3 one person event.

In April 2008, he was one of four Navarre sportspeople on the short list to attend the Beijing Paralympics.

References 

Spanish boccia players
Living people
1954 births
Paralympic gold medalists for Spain
Paralympic silver medalists for Spain
Boccia players at the 1996 Summer Paralympics
Boccia players at the 2000 Summer Paralympics
Boccia players at the 2004 Summer Paralympics
Boccia players at the 2008 Summer Paralympics
Sportspeople from La Rioja
Paralympic boccia players of Spain
Medalists at the 2000 Summer Paralympics
Medalists at the 2004 Summer Paralympics
Paralympic medalists in boccia